Sugō, Sugo or Sugou is a Japanese surname. Notable people with the surname include:

, better known as Masaki Suda, Japanese actor and singer
, Japanese voice actor

Fictional characters
, a character in the light novel series Sword Art Online

Japanese-language surnames